Dawsonellidae is an extinct taxonomic family of fossil sea snails, marine, gastropod mollusks.

References

Prehistoric gastropods